Clathrus treubii is a species of fungus in the stinkhorn family. It is found in Indonesia.

References

Phallales
Fungi of Asia
Fungi described in 1906